George Hotel or The George Hotel may refer to:

in Australia
George Hotel, Sydney

in Ukraine
Hotel George (Lviv)

in the United Kingdom
The George Hotel, also known as The Principal Edinburgh George Street , Edinburgh, Scotland
George Hotel, Huddersfield, England, notable for being the birthplace of rugby league football
George Hotel, Kilmarnock, Scotland
George Hotel, Chepstow, Wales
The George Hotel, Crawley, England
The George Hotel, Reading, England
George Hotel, Stamford, England, historic coaching inn
The George Hotel, The Parade, Castletown, Isle of Man, an Isle of Man registered building
George Hotel, Swaffham, Norfolk, United Kingdom

in the United States
George Hotel (Kanosh, Utah), listed on the National Register of Historic Places

See also 
 Royal George Hotel (disambiguation)
George Washington Hotel (disambiguation)